Preston Riley (born October 30, 1947) is a former American football wide receiver. He played for the San Francisco 49ers from 1970 to 1972 and for the New Orleans Saints in 1973.  Preston Riley is infamous for fumbling the onside kick in the 1972 playoff game against the Dallas Cowboys that allowed Dallas to complete a miraculous comeback and prevent San Francisco from going to their first Super Bowl.

References

1947 births
Living people
American football wide receivers
Memphis Tigers football players
San Francisco 49ers players
New Orleans Saints players